Vasilyevka is a rural locality (a village) in Krasnozilimsky Selsoviet, Arkhangelsky District, Bashkortostan, Russia. The population was 18 as of 2010. There is 1 street.

Geography 
Vasilyevka is located 8 km southwest of Arkhangelskoye (the district's administrative centre) by road. Pobeda is the nearest rural locality.

References 

Rural localities in Arkhangelsky District